Tetraschalis is a genus of moths in the family Pterophoridae.

Species
Tetraschalis arachnodes Meyrick, 1887
Tetraschalis deltozela Meyrick, 1924
Tetraschalis ischnites Meyrick, 1908
Tetraschalis lemurodes Meyrick, 1907
Tetraschalis mikado (Hori, 1933)
Tetraschalis ochrias Meyrick, 1908

Pterophorinae
Moth genera
Taxa named by Edward Meyrick